Theridion cuspulatum is a species of tangle-web spiders of the family Theridiidae. It is endemic in Cape Verde.

References

Further reading
Schmidt & Krause (1998), Spinnen von Santo Antão und Maio sowie zwei Salticidae von Fogo und São Nicolau (Cabo Verde) (Arachnida: Araneae). [Spiders of Santo Antão and Maio With Two Salticidae From Fogo and São Nicolau (Cape Verde)] Entomologische Zeitschrift, Frankfurt am Main, vol. 108, p. 416-428.

Theridiidae
Spiders of Africa
Spiders described in 1998
Taxa named by Günter E. W. Schmidt
Taxa named by Rolf Harald Krause
Arthropods of Cape Verde
Endemic fauna of Cape Verde